Libby Swanson Jacobs (born October 1, 1956) is a former Iowa State Representative from the 60th District.

Education
Jacobs received her BA in political science from the University of Nebraska and her MPA from Drake University.

Career
Prior to her career in politics, Jacobs was president of a consulting firm called The Jacobs Group, LLC. She also spent some time in the telecommunications, non-profit, and financial services industries.

She served in the Iowa House of Representatives from 1995 to 2009. She was a majority whip and sat on several committees: the Commerce committee; the Judiciary committee; the State Government committee; and the Ways and Means committee. Jacobs was re-elected in 2006 with 7,849 votes, running unopposed. 

As a member of the Iowa Utilities Board, she voted in June 2016 alongside Nick Wagner in favor and against Chairwoman Geri Huser to allow the controversial construction of the Bakken pipeline to continue.

Awards and honors
Jacobs has won a number of awards which include:
West Des Moines Citizen of the Year (2008)
Drake University Outstanding Master of Public Administration Alumnus Award (2008)
Greater Des Moines Leadership Institute Business Leadership Award (2008),
Iowa Grocers Association Legislative Leadership Award (2005)
Des Moines Business Record Woman of Influence (2001)

Family
Jacobs is married to her husband Steve and together they have two daughters. They reside in West Des Moines.

References

External links
 Jacobs on Project Vote Smart
 Jacobs's Capitol Web Address

Republican Party members of the Iowa House of Representatives
Living people
Women state legislators in Iowa
1956 births
University of Nebraska alumni
Drake University alumni
Politicians from Lincoln, Nebraska
People from West Des Moines, Iowa
21st-century American women